Walter Romanowicz (April 24, 1918 – July 9, 1986) was an American soccer goalkeeper.  He played for the Fall River, Massachusetts, Ponta Delgada S.C. which won the 1947 National Challenge Cup and National Amateur Cup.  Based on these result, the U.S. Soccer Federation selected the club to act as the U.S. national team at the 1947 NAFC Championship.  As a result, Romanowicz earned two caps with the U.S. national team.  In the first game, the U.S. 5-0 to Mexico and in the second, they lost 5-2 to Cuba.

Romanowicz was inducted into the New England Soccer Hall of Fame in 1986. He died in Fall River, Massachusetts.

References

1918 births
1986 deaths
United States men's international soccer players
Ponta Delgada S.C. players
Association football goalkeepers
American soccer players